The Stingray, sometimes known as the Commando Stingray, is a light tank produced by Textron Marine & Land Systems division (formerly Cadillac Gage). It was specifically designed to use as many existing components of other American armored fighting vehicles as possible to keep costs down. The Stingray was a private venture project aimed at foreign countries. As of 2020, Textron has kept the Stingray name registered.

It was exported for use by armed forces of Thailand, who remain the only user.

History
The Stingray was developed in the 1980s as a private venture by Cadillac Gage Textron. The first prototype was completed in 1985.

In 1988, the Royal Thai Army pressed the Stingray in service with 106 tanks purchased. The contract was for $150 million. Cadillac Gage provided assistance in repairing some of them after they obtained reports of cracked hulls.

In 1992, development of the Stingray II started. Its production was complete in 1994 with marketing promoted to friendly countries like Malaysia, Saudi Arabia, and Taiwan up until 2003.

Cadillac Gage Textron submitted a version of the Stingray for the U.S. Army's Armored Gun System program. This was a Stingray hull mated to the former joint Army–Marine Corps LAV-105 turret. It had the fairly conventional layout with a four-man crew. The AGS Stingray carried 36 rounds, with eight in ready storage. In June 1992, Cadillac Gage lost to a proposal from FMC.

In 2010, Federal Defense Industries announced that they entered into an agreement with Textron Marine & Land Systems in order to provide authorized aftermarket parts, support and other types of assistance for the Stingray since FDI maintains a technical library for spare parts.

In 2011, Napco entered into an agreement with Textron to provide authorized aftermarket parts, support and other types of assistance for the Stingray.

Variants

Stingray
The Stingray has a 105 mm rifled cannon. Its cruise speed is 44 mph (71 km/h). Maximum grade is 60%. The maximum vertical distance it can scale is 2.7 feet (82 cm). It can ford water up to 3.5 feet (107 cm).  It is air transportable in a C-130 cargo aircraft. The original Stingray program was launched in 1983, with the first prototype vehicle ready in August 1984. The Stingray turret was also marketed separately for retrofit installation on the hull of the M41, M47 or M551 tank or on the V600 armored car. Its armor was made from CG's Cadaloy armor.

The Stingray can be upgraded with the CG Fire Control and Stabilization Upgrade Kit as an affordable solution to upgrade its fire control systems.

Stingray II
The Stingray II is an upgrade version of the Stingray, developed by Cadillac Gage as a private-venture armored fighting vehicle (AFV) for the export market. The light tank's baseline armor, while thin, is adequate for a light cavalry, reconnaissance or light infantry fire support role; it protects its occupants from armor-piercing, heavy machine gun rounds up to 14.5 mm in size. Additional armor appliqué can be fitted to increase ballistic protection. Operational range is increased by about 25 miles (about 40 kilometers) if one assumes a travel speed of about 30 mph (48 km/h). In addition, the engine on the Stingray II has been upgraded to 410 kW (550 horsepower) at 2,300 rpm.

The Stingray's main armament is a low recoil force (LRF) version of the British Royal Ordnance L7 105 mm rifled gun installed in a well-angled and electro-hydraulically powered turret having manual backup as is usually found on tanks, together with duplicate turret controls for the gunner and the commander, providing redundancy. Dimensions of the turret were deliberately designed to allow it to be refitted to M41 Walker Bulldog and M551 Sheridan vehicles as an upgrade. The gun has optional stabilization in two axes, and eight rounds, with another 24 rounds stored in the hull.  Complementing the main gun is a 7.62 mm co-axial machine gun with 2,400 rounds, as well as a 12.7 mm M2 Browning anti-aircraft machine gun with 1,100 rounds on the commander's hatch. The Stingray II is fitted with 16 protective smoke grenade launch tubes, with 8 of them on each side. The optic system for the gunner is composed of a two-axis stabilized day/night thermal imaging system called 'Hughes Hire,' made by the company then known as Hughes Electronics, together with a laser rangefinder. For the commander, there is another optical system that has seven different periscopes, and there is also a repeater display for the same thermal image seen by the gunner.

The main improvements offered in the Stingray II are a more capable digital fire-control system, NBC equipment, enhanced mobility and superior target-engagement capabilities. The Stingray II also improves the armor to provide protection from 23 mm rounds.

Two Stingray IIs were made to showcase its weapons and equipment for demonstration to potential customers.

Armored Gun System
AGS-Stingray
Stingray modified for the Armored Gun System competition but lost to the FMC Close Combat Vehicle Light which became the type-classified M8 Armored Gun System.

AGS-Sheridan
The AGS-Sheridan was a mating of the standard M551 Sheridan hull with the turret of the Stingray light tank.

See also
 TH 301 (TAM)

References

Further reading

External links

 Archived Textron brochure

Light tanks of the Cold War
Light tanks of the United States
Textron
Cold War tanks of the United States
Post–Cold War light tanks
Military vehicles introduced in the 1980s